The Amor asteroids are a group of near-Earth asteroids named after the archetype object 1221 Amor . The orbital perihelion of these objects is close to, but greater than, the orbital aphelion of Earth (i.e., the objects do not cross Earth's orbit), with most Amors crossing the orbit of Mars. The Amor asteroid 433 Eros was the first asteroid to be orbited and landed upon by a robotic space probe (NEAR Shoemaker).

Definition 

The orbital characteristics that define an asteroid as being in the Amor group are:

 The orbital period is greater than one year; i.e., the orbital semi-major axis (a) is greater than 1.0 AU (a > 1.0 AU);
 The orbit does not cross that of Earth; i.e., the orbital perihelion (q) is greater than Earth's orbital aphelion (q > 1.017 AU);
 The object is a near-Earth object (NEO); i.e., q < 1.3 AU.

Populations 
As of 2023 there are 11,232 known Amor asteroids. Of those objects, 1275 are numbered and 80 are named.

Outer Earth-grazer asteroids 

An outer Earth-grazer asteroid is an asteroid that is normally beyond Earth's orbit, but which can get closer to the Sun than Earth's aphelion (1.0167 AU), and not closer than Earth's perihelion (0.9833 AU); i.e., the asteroid's perihelion is between Earth's perihelion and aphelion. Outer Earth-grazer asteroids are split between Amor and Apollo asteroids. Using the definition of Amor asteroids above, "Earth grazers" that never get closer to the Sun than Earth does (at any point along its orbit) are Amors, whereas those that do are Apollos.

Potentially hazardous asteroids 

To be considered a potentially hazardous asteroid (PHA), an object's orbit must, at some point, come within 0.05 AU of Earth's orbit, and the object itself must be sufficiently large/massive to cause significant regional damage if it impacted Earth. Most PHAs are either Aten asteroids or Apollo asteroids (and thus have orbits that cross the orbit of Earth), but approximately one tenth of PHAs are Amor asteroids. A potentially hazardous Amor asteroid therefore must have a perihelion of less than 1.05 AU. Approximately 20% of the known Amors meet this requirement, and about a fifth of those are PHAs. The fifty known Amor PHAs include the named objects 2061 Anza, 3122 Florence, 3908 Nyx, and 3671 Dionysus.

Lists

Prominent Amor asteroids

Named Amor asteroids 

This is a non-static list of named Amor asteroids.

See also 
 List of Amor asteroid records
 Apollo asteroid
 Aten asteroid
 Atira asteroid
 Alinda asteroid
 Arjuna asteroid
 List of minor planets

References

External links 
 List of Amor minor planets

Amor